Agios Ioannis Selemani is a deserted village in the Nicosia District of Cyprus, located within the UN Buffer Zone close to Kato Pyrgos.

Communities in Nicosia District
Former populated places in Cyprus